Kidnapped is a two-part BBC television adaptation of the 1886 novel of the same name by Robert Louis Stevenson. The show is directed by Brendan Maher and stars James Anthony Pearson as Davie Balfour and Iain Glen as Alan Breck.

Production
On 1 December 2004, it was announced that the BBC had commissioned Kidnapped.

Plot
Among the plot deviations from novel to film:
 The film added a love interest for Davie in Catriona, the daughter of James of the Glen. This plot element is from Stevenson's sequel novel, Catriona.
 In the novel Kidnapped, Breck and James of the Glen were never arrested by the British, but the film showed James of the Glen being falsely arrested with the threat of being hanged, to force Breck to give himself up. The arrest of James of The Glen is another feature taken from Catriona.
 The film added the Long Mile Gang, expert trackers, to track Davie and Breck across Scotland, but the novel only had British troops.

References

External links 
 
 

2005 British television series debuts
2005 British television series endings
2005 television films
2005 films
2000s adventure drama films
2000s British television miniseries
Films based on Kidnapped (novel)
British television films
Television series by South Pacific Pictures